WVUT (channel 22), branded on-air as Vincennes PBS, is a PBS member television station in Vincennes, Indiana, United States (which is technically part of the Terre Haute television market, for which WVUT is the PBS member station of record). Owned by Vincennes University, it is sister to campus radio station WVUB (91.1 FM). WVUT's studios are located on North 2nd Street and Rosedale Avenue in Vincennes, and its transmitter is located southeast of the city off SR 61.

History
The station's history traces back to the launch of a television station in Princeton, WRAY-TV (channel 52), a commercial independent station that signed on in December 1953; it was co-owned with radio station WRAY (1250 AM), which shared studio space with WRAY-TV. With competition from two television stations—WTVW and WFIE-TV—out of the nearby Evansville market, WRAY-TV was never successful and ceased operations after seven months, except for annual March of Dimes telethons through 1960. In late 1960, Vincennes University purchased the studio equipment; WRAY-TV's license was surrendered to the Federal Communications Commission (FCC) in February 1961.

Vincennes University applied for channel 52 to be substituted for the originally provided 44 in Vincennes to avoid retuning equipment. This was granted, and an application for construction permit followed in 1964. In 1965, the old channel 52 allocation was changed to UHF channel 34, and the construction permit originally issued on February 8, 1966, was issued under that allocation, only to be changed by the FCC to channel 22 a few weeks later as part of a second nationwide realignment of channel allocations for stations that had not yet been built. WVUT first signed on the air on February 15, 1968 (formal programming began four days later), as a member station of National Educational Television (NET). WVUT joined PBS when the reorganized network launched on October 5, 1970.

Programming
Local programming on WVUT includes a student-produced newscast, titled NewsCenter 22, which airs during Vincennes University's fall, winter and spring terms, as well as the weekly public affairs program 22 Magazine.

Technical information

Subchannels
The station's digital signal is multiplexed:

Analog-to-digital conversion
WVUT discontinued regular programming on its analog signal, over UHF channel 22, on June 12, 2009, the official date in which full-power television stations in the United States transitioned from analog to digital broadcasts under federal mandate. The station's digital signal relocated from its pre-transition UHF channel 52, which was among the high band UHF channels (52-69) that were removed from broadcasting use as a result of the transition, to its analog-era UHF channel 22 for post-transition operations.

As a result of the FCC repack, the station now broadcasts on UHF channel 31.

References

External links
 Official website
WVUT page on the Vincennes University website

Television channels and stations established in 1968
VUT
Vincennes University
1968 establishments in Indiana